Midgham railway station, formerly known as Woolhampton railway station, is a railway station in the English county of Berkshire.

History
The station at Woolhampton was opened with the line on 21 December 1847; it was originally named "Woolhampton" but on 1 March 1873 was renamed "Midgham". The station appeared in a 1943 World War 2 information film for US service personnel titled A Welcome to Britain.

The station was subsequently renamed twice by British Rail: on 2 November 1964 it became "Midgham Halt" but on 5 May 1969 it reverted to "Midgham".

Description
Midgham station is near the centre of Woolhampton village, on an unclassified road just south of its junction with the A4 road. There are two flanking platforms on each side of the double track line. The Reading bound platform has a small shelter and a small car park. The unclassified road crosses the railway line at the eastern end of the station by means of a level crossing, and this crossing also provides the only access between the platforms.

Services
Trains run hourly in both directions on Mondays to Saturdays, and every other hour on a Sunday. Typical journey times are about 12 minutes to Newbury and 20 minutes to Reading. Passengers for  must normally change trains at Reading (except on Sundays, when services run to & from the capital).

Incidents
On 10 August 1927, the leading bogie of the then new King class locomotive, 6003 King George IV, became derailed at speed approaching Midgham. This led to the suspension arrangement of the unusual bogie being improved.

References

External links
 Brief moment at Midgham Station in 1943 WW2 US Induction ilm (youtube) at starting at 22mins 27secs in.
 Midgham - Least Used Station in Berkshire 2017 YouTube video by Geoff Marshall about the station.

Railway stations in Berkshire
DfT Category F2 stations
Former Great Western Railway stations
Railway stations in Great Britain opened in 1847
Railway stations served by Great Western Railway
1847 establishments in England
Woolhampton